Ametroproctidae is a family of mites belonging to the order Sarcoptiformes.

Genera:
 Ametroproctus Higgins & Woolley, 1968
 Scapuleremaeus Behan-Pelletier, 1989

References

Sarcoptiformes